Kevin Stott (born 1967) is a soccer referee for PRO from the United States. He was a FIFA referee from 1995 to 2008. Stott was selected as a referee for the 2006 FIFA World Cup in Germany.

Stott was selected as MLS Referee of the Year in 2010, after being selected as a finalist seven times. He has been a referee in MLS for 20 years.

Honors
 MLS Referee of the Year: 2010

Card statistics

References

External links
  (archive)
  (archive)
 
 

1967 births
Living people
2006 FIFA World Cup referees
American soccer referees
CONCACAF Gold Cup referees
CONCACAF Champions League referees
Major League Soccer referees